Nylund may refer to:

 Nylund, a neighborhood (delområde) in the borough Storhaug in Stavanger, Norway
  Nylund, a surname of Scandinavian origin meaning "new grove"

People
 Camilla Nylund (born 1968), Finnish soprano
 Eric Nylund (born 1964), American science fiction author
 Gary Nylund (born 1963), Canadian hockey player
 Mattias Nylund (born 1980), Swedish soccer player
 Olav Kjetilson Nylund (1903–1957), Norwegian politician
 Ossian Nylund, Finnish track and field athlete
 Sven Nylund (1894–1975), Swedish diver

Other
 Rose Nylund, fictional character on the situation comedy, The Golden Girls